Charles Arbuthnot may refer to:

 Charles Arbuthnot (1767–1850), British Tory politician and diplomat
 Charles Arbuthnot (abbot) (1737–1820), renowned Scottish abbot
 Sir Charles George Arbuthnot (1824–1899), British lieutenant general
 Charles George James Arbuthnot (1801–1870), British general and MP
 Charles Ramsay Arbuthnot (1850–1913), British admiral
 Charles Mertz Arbuthnot (1852–1920), American physician

See also
 Arbuthnot (disambiguation)
 Charles